Trichophysetis obnubilalis is a moth in the family Crambidae. It is found in Russia (Amur).

References

Cybalomiinae
Moths described in 1881
Moths of Asia